The 1891 Syracuse Orangemen football team represented Syracuse University during the 1891 college football season. The head coach was William Galbraith, coaching his first season with the Orangemen.

Schedule

References

Syracuse
Syracuse Orange football seasons
Syracuse Orangemen football